Kildress is a village and civil parish on the outskirts of Cookstown in County Tyrone, Northern Ireland.

There are two churches in the area. One is St. Patrick's Church of Ireland and the other is St. Joseph's Catholic Church, Killeenan. St. Patrick's Church was built in 1818.  The present St. Joseph's Church was built in 1996. It replaced an earlier church that was built in 1855. The local primary school is St. Joseph's Primary School.

Nearby is Drum Manor Forest Park and Wellbrook Beetling Mill.

It is home to Cloughfin Pipe Band and the Kildress Wolfe Tones GAA club.

See also
List of civil parishes of County Tyrone

References

Villages in County Tyrone
Civil parishes of County Tyrone